Kinzua Bridge State Park is a  Pennsylvania state park near Mount Jewett, in Hamlin and Keating Townships, McKean County, Pennsylvania in the United States. The park lies between U.S. Route 6 and Pennsylvania Route 59, along State Route 3011 just east of the Allegheny National Forest.

Kinzua Bridge State Park was chosen by the Pennsylvania Department of Conservation and Natural Resources (DCNR) and its Bureau of Parks as one of "25 Must-See Pennsylvania State Parks".

The Kinzua Bridge Foundation, Inc. was formally incorporated in the State of Pennsylvania on November 1, 1993. It is a non-profit 501(c)3 which is a separate entity from the State Park. The Foundation is dedicated to the restoration and preservation of the Kinzua Bridge, the promotion of its historical and cultural significance, as well as the further development of the adjoining State Park.

Kinzua Bridge

The park is noted as the site of the Kinzua Bridge spanning Kinzua Creek, original bridge built in 1882, subsequent bridge built in 1900 and destroyed in 2003 by a tornado. The Erie Railroad company originally owned and operated the bridge.

William Scranton, then governor of Pennsylvania, signed legislation creating Kinzua Bridge State Park in 1963, although the park did not officially open until 1970. In 1987, excursion  trains of the Knox and Kane Railroad again began running on the bridge. The trains traveled from Kane with a trip through the Allegheny National Forest and made a stop on the bridge before returning to Kane.

The Knox and Kane Railroad offered excursion rail trips across the bridge until June, 2002, when it was closed for restoration. At approximately 3:20 p.m., July 21, 2003, a tornado from the east touched down at the park. The storm, classified as F-1 on the Fujita scale, tore down 11 of the 20 structure spans and nearby trees were snapped and uprooted. The failure was caused by badly rusted bolts holding the bases of the towers. The investigation reckoned that the whole structure oscillated laterally 4-5 times before fatigue broke the base bolts. The towers fell intact in sections, and they suffered impact damage with the ground. They have been left as they fell, and it is intended to make the ruins a visitor attraction to show the forces of nature at work.

In 2011, the bridge was reinvented as the Kinzua Bridge Skywalk, a new pedestrian walkway where visitors can stroll 600 feet out on the remaining support towers, peer miles out into the Kinzua Gorge as well as peer down into the partial glass platform at the end of the walkway.

Recreation

A scenic view overlooks the fallen bridge and Kinzua Creek Valley. The overlook is also a prime location to view the fall foliage during the first two weeks of October. The park also has a shaded picnic area with a centrally located modern restroom.  The Kinzua Bridge Foundation, Inc., in 2021, had a large playground area installed, which was dedicated to the memory of Hannah Catherine Wolfe of Smethport.

Hunters are expected to follow the rules and regulations of the Pennsylvania Game Commission. The common game species are black bears, eastern gray squirrel, white-tailed deer, and wild turkey. The hunting of groundhogs is prohibited.

Nearby state parks

The following state parks are within  of Kinzua Bridge State Park:
Allegany State Park (New York)
Bendigo State Park (Elk County) 
Bucktail State Park Natural Area (Cameron and Clinton Counties)
Chapman State Park (Warren County)
Elk State Park (Elk County)
Sizerville State Park (Cameron and Potter Counties)

References

External links

  

State parks of Pennsylvania
Protected areas established in 1963
Parks in McKean County, Pennsylvania
Protected areas of McKean County, Pennsylvania